Sheykh Qeshlaq or Sheykhqeshlaq may refer to:
 Sheykh Qeshlaq-e Olya